Elephantopus is a genus of perennial plants in the daisy family (Asteraceae).

The genus is widespread over much of Africa, southern Asia, Australia, and the Americas. Several species are native to the southeastern United States, and at least one is native to India and the Himalayas.

Uses
Elephantopus scaber is a traditional medicine and other species, including E. mollis and E. carolinianus, have also been investigated for medicinal properties. Elephantopus scaber contains elephantopin which is a germacranolide sesquiterpene lactone containing two lactone rings and an epoxide functional group.

Species
 accepted species
 Elephantopus angolensis O.Hoffm. - Angola
 Elephantopus arenarius Britton & P.Wilson ex Britton - Cuba 
 Elephantopus arenosus Krasch.  - Brazil
 Elephantopus biflorus (Less.) Sch.Bip. - Brazil
 Elephantopus carolinianus Raeusch.- southeastern + south-central United States; Cuba, Puerto Rico
 Elephantopus dilatatus Gleason - Costa Rica, Panama
 Elephantopus elatus Bertol. - southeastern United States
 Elephantopus elongatus Gardner- Brazil
 Elephantopus hirtiflorus DC. - Brazil, Venezuela
 Elephantopus mendoncae Philipson - Angola
 Elephantopus micropappus Less.- Brazil
 Elephantopus mollis Kunth  native to Latin America + West Indies; widely naturalized in tropics of Africa, Asia, Australia, various islands
 Elephantopus multisetus O.Hoffm. ex T.Durand & De Wild. - Angola, Zaire, Tanzania
 Elephantopus nudatus A.Gray - southeastern + south-central United States, east Texas to Maryland
 Elephantopus nudicaulis Poir. - Mexico
 Elephantopus palustris Gardner - Brazil, Bolivia, Paraguay
 Elephantopus piauiensis R.Barros & Semir - Brazil
 Elephantopus pratensis C.Wright - Cuba
 Elephantopus racemosus Gardner- Brazil
 Elephantopus riparius Gardner- Brazil
 Elephantopus scaber L.- China, India, southeast Asia, northern Australia; naturalized in Africa, Madagascar, Latin America
 Elephantopus senegalensis (Klatt) Oliv. & Hiern- tropical Africa
 Elephantopus tomentosus L. - southern United States
 Elephantopus vernonioides S. Moore - Africa
 Elephantopus virgatus Desv. ex Ham. -  Guyana 
 Elephantopus welwitschii Hiern - Africa

References

Asteraceae genera
Vernonieae